Frederick Haig (23 April 1895 – 3 December 1948) was a New Zealand cricketer. He played one first-class match for Otago in 1919/20.

See also
 List of Otago representative cricketers

References

External links
 

1895 births
1948 deaths
New Zealand cricketers
Otago cricketers
Cricketers from Whanganui